Consolation Valley is a valley in Alberta, Canada. It is situated within Banff National Park, and adjacent to Valley of the Ten Peaks.

Consolation Valley was so named on account of its fine appearance. The landform's toponym was officially adopted on July 2, 1959, by the Geographical Names Board of Canada. The valley is bound by Mount Babel, Mount Fay, Quadra Mountain, Bident Mountain, Mount Bell, and Panorama Ridge. Two lakes officially named Consolation Lakes occupy the valley and are drained by Babel Creek. The head of the valley (south end) opens at Consolation Pass.

Climate

Based on the Köppen climate classification, the valley is located in a subarctic climate zone with cold, snowy winters, and mild summers. Winter temperatures can drop below -20 °C with wind chill factors below -30 °C.

References

Gallery

Valleys of Alberta
Banff National Park
Canadian Rockies